Sondre Oddvoll Bøe (born 13 January 1998) is a Norwegian former figure skater. He is the 2019 Nordic champion and a four-time Norwegian national champion. He has competed in the final segment at nine ISU Championships (six European and three World Junior Championships).

Personal life
Sondre Oddvoll Bøe was born on 13 January 1998 in Bærum, Norway. He attended Bjørknes secondary school in Oslo. His older sister, Emilie, has also competed in figure skating. He also has a younger brother named Haakon. Bøe practiced gymnastics in addition to figure skating until he was 11 years old.

Career
Bøe began learning to skate in 2002. From an early age, he trained mainly under Berit Steigedal in Asker, Norway, and visited Oberstdorf, Germany for additional coaching by Michael Huth. After debuting on the ISU Junior Grand Prix (JGP) series in 2012, he competed at the 2013 World Junior Championships in Milan but did not reach the free skate.

Making his senior international debut, he placed 25th at the 2014 European Championships in Budapest, Hungary. He qualified for the free skate at the 2014 World Junior Championships in Sofia, Bulgaria and finished 24th overall.

In the summer of 2014, Bøe decided to train mainly in Oberstdorf. Competing in the 2014–15 JGP series, he placed 13th in Tallinn and 14th in Dresden. He was named in the Norwegian team to the 2015 European Championships in Stockholm, Sweden. There he qualified for the free skate, and placed 22nd overall. At the Nordics he won the senior silver medal. Bøe also competed at the 2015 Junior Worlds in Tallinn, but was eliminated after the short.

During the 2015–16 JGP series, Bøe placed tenth at both of his assignments, in Riga and Torun. Ranked 20th in the short, he advanced to the free skate at the 2016 European Championships in Bratislava and finished 24th overall. He also reached the final segment at the 2016 World Junior Championships in Debrecen, Hungary, placing 21st overall.

Bøe returned to Norway by December 2017, deciding to rejoin Berit Steigedal in Asker. In February 2019, he outscored Alexander Majorov to win gold at The Nordics.

Bøe retired from competitive skating in March 2021.

Programs

Competitive highlights 
CS: Challenger Series; JGP: Junior Grand Prix

References

External links 

 

1998 births
Norwegian male single skaters
Living people
Sportspeople from Bærum